Trzy Gwiazdy (Polish for "Three Stars") is a Polish coat of arms. It was used by several szlachta (noble) families under the Polish–Lithuanian Commonwealth.

History

Blazon

Notable bearers

Notable bearers of this coat of arms have included:

 "Inés"  and "de León" (Heraldaria)

External links

See also

 Polish heraldry
 Heraldry
 Coat of Arms
 List of Polish nobility coats of arms
 Dynastic Genealogy
 Ornatowski.com

Trzy Gwiazdy